In mathematics, the unitary group of degree n, denoted U(n), is the group of  unitary matrices, with the group operation of matrix multiplication. The unitary group is a subgroup of the general linear group . Hyperorthogonal group is an archaic name for the unitary group, especially over finite fields. For the group of unitary matrices with determinant 1, see Special unitary group.

In the simple case , the group U(1) corresponds to the circle group, consisting of all complex numbers with absolute value 1, under multiplication. All the unitary groups contain copies of this group.

The unitary group U(n) is a real Lie group of dimension n2. The Lie algebra of U(n) consists of  skew-Hermitian matrices, with the Lie bracket given by the commutator.

The general unitary group (also called the group of unitary similitudes) consists of all matrices A such that A∗A is a nonzero multiple of the identity matrix, and is just the product of the unitary group with the group of all positive multiples of the identity matrix.

Properties
Since the determinant of a unitary matrix is a complex number with norm , the determinant gives a group homomorphism

The kernel of this homomorphism is the set of unitary matrices with determinant . This subgroup is called the special unitary group, denoted . We then have a short exact sequence of Lie groups:

Topology

As a topological space, U(n) is both compact and connected. To show that U(n) is connected, recall that any unitary matrix A can be diagonalized by another unitary matrix S. Any diagonal unitary matrix must have complex numbers of absolute value 1 on the main diagonal. We can therefore write

A path in U(n) from the identity to A is then given by

The unitary group is not simply connected; the fundamental group of U(n) is infinite cyclic for all n:

To see this, note that the above splitting of U(n) as a semidirect product of SU(n) and U(1) induces a topological product structure on U(n), so that

Now the first unitary group U(1) is topologically a circle, which is well known to have a fundamental group isomorphic to Z, whereas  is simply connected.

The determinant map  induces an isomorphism of fundamental groups, with the splitting  inducing the inverse.

The Weyl group of U(n) is the symmetric group Sn, acting on the diagonal torus  by permuting the entries:

Related groups

2-out-of-3 property
The unitary group is the 3-fold intersection of the orthogonal, complex, and symplectic groups:

Thus a unitary structure can be seen as an orthogonal structure, a complex structure, and a symplectic structure, which are required to be compatible (meaning that one uses the same J in the complex structure and the symplectic form, and that this J is orthogonal; writing all the groups as matrix groups fixes a J (which is orthogonal) and ensures compatibility).

In fact, it is the intersection of any two of these three; thus a compatible orthogonal and complex structure induce a symplectic structure, and so forth.

At the level of equations, this can be seen as follows:

Any two of these equations implies the third.

At the level of forms, this can be seen by decomposing a Hermitian form into its real and imaginary parts: the real part is symmetric (orthogonal), and the imaginary part is skew-symmetric (symplectic)—and these are related by the complex structure (which is the compatibility).

From this perspective, what is unexpected is the intersection .

Special unitary and projective unitary groups

Just as the orthogonal group O(n) has the special orthogonal group SO(n) as subgroup and the projective orthogonal group PO(n) as quotient, and the projective special orthogonal group PSO(n) as subquotient, the unitary group U(n) has associated to it the special unitary group SU(n), the projective unitary group PU(n), and the projective special unitary group PSU(n). These are related as by the commutative diagram at right; notably, both projective groups are equal: .

The above is for the classical unitary group (over the complex numbers) – for unitary groups over finite fields, one similarly obtains special unitary and projective unitary groups, but in general .

G-structure: almost Hermitian
In the language of G-structures, a manifold with a U(n)-structure is an almost Hermitian manifold.

Generalizations
From the point of view of Lie theory, the classical unitary group is a real form of the Steinberg group , which is an algebraic group that arises from the combination of the diagram automorphism of the general linear group (reversing the Dynkin diagram An, which corresponds to transpose inverse) and the field automorphism of the extension C/R (namely complex conjugation). Both these automorphisms are automorphisms of the algebraic group, have order 2, and commute, and the unitary group is the fixed points of the product automorphism, as an algebraic group. The classical unitary group is a real form of this group, corresponding to the standard Hermitian form Ψ, which is positive definite.

This can be generalized in a number of ways:
 generalizing to other Hermitian forms yields indefinite unitary groups ;
 the field extension can be replaced by any degree 2 separable algebra, most notably a degree 2 extension of a finite field;
 generalizing to other diagrams yields other groups of Lie type, namely the other Steinberg groups  (in addition to ) and Suzuki-Ree groups
 
 considering a generalized unitary group as an algebraic group, one can take its points over various algebras.

Indefinite forms
Analogous to the indefinite orthogonal groups, one can define an indefinite unitary group, by considering the transforms that preserve a given Hermitian form, not necessarily positive definite (but generally taken to be non-degenerate). Here one is working with a vector space over the complex numbers.

Given a Hermitian form Ψ on a complex vector space V, the unitary group U(Ψ) is the group of transforms that preserve the form: the transform M such that  for all . In terms of matrices, representing the form by a matrix denoted Φ, this says that .

Just as for symmetric forms over the reals, Hermitian forms are determined by signature, and are all unitarily congruent to a diagonal form with p entries of 1 on the diagonal and q entries of −1. In a standard basis, this is represented as a quadratic form as:

and as a symmetric form as:

The resulting group is denoted .

Finite fields
Over the finite field with  elements, Fq, there is a unique quadratic extension field, Fq2, with order 2 automorphism  (the rth power of the Frobenius automorphism). Further, all non-degenerate Hermitian forms on a vector space over a finite field are unitarily congruent to the standard one, represented by the identity matrix; that is, any Hermitian form is unitarily equivalent to

For convenience, this article will use the  convention. The center of the special unitary group has order  and consists of those unitary scalars which also have order dividing n. The quotient of the unitary group by its center is called the projective unitary group, and the quotient of the special unitary group by its center is the projective special unitary group .

Degree-2 separable algebras
More generally, given a field k and a degree-2 separable k-algebra K (which may be a field extension but need not be), one can define unitary groups with respect to this extension.

First, there is a unique k-automorphism of K  which is an involution and fixes exactly k ( if and only if ). This generalizes complex conjugation and the conjugation of degree 2 finite field extensions, and allows one to define Hermitian forms and unitary groups as above.

Algebraic groups
The unitary group is thus an algebraic group, whose points over a k-algebra R are given by:

For the field extension C/R and the standard (positive definite) Hermitian form, these yield an algebraic group with real and complex points given by:

In fact, the unitary group is a linear algebraic group.

Unitary group of a quadratic module
The unitary group of a quadratic module is a generalisation of the linear algebraic group U just defined, which incorporates as special cases many different classical algebraic groups. The definition goes back to Anthony Bak's thesis.

To define it, one has to define quadratic modules first:

Define

A pair  such that R is a ring and Λ a form parameter is called form ring.

Let M be an R-module and f a J-sesquilinear form on M (i.e.,  for any  and ).

To any quadratic module  defined by a J-sesquilinear form f on M over a form ring  one can associate the unitary group

The special case where , with J any non-trivial involution (i.e.,  and  gives back the "classical" unitary group (as an algebraic group).

Polynomial invariants
The unitary groups are the automorphisms of two polynomials in real non-commutative variables:

These are easily seen to be the real and imaginary parts of the complex form . The two invariants separately are invariants of O(2n) and Sp(2n). Combined they make the invariants of U(n) which is a subgroup of both these groups. The variables must be non-commutative in these invariants otherwise the second polynomial is identically zero.

Classifying space
The classifying space for U(n) is described in the article Classifying space for U(n).

See also
Special unitary group
Projective unitary group
Orthogonal group
Symplectic group

Notes

References

 

Lie groups